In the Latin-based orthographies of many European languages, the letter  is used in different contexts to represent two distinct phonemes that in English are called hard and soft . In English, the sound of soft  is the affricate , as in general, giant, and gym. A  at the end of a word usually renders a hard  (as in "rag"), while if a soft rendition is intended it would be followed by a silent  (as in "rage").

History
Later, other languages not descended from Latin, such as English, inherited this feature as an orthographic convention. The Scandinavian languages, however, have undergone their shift independently.

English

In words of Greco-Latinate origin, the soft  pronunciation occurs before  while the hard  pronunciation occurs elsewhere. In some words of Germanic origin (e.g. get, give), loan words from other languages (e.g. geisha, pierogi), and irregular Greco-Latinate words (e.g. gynecology), the hard pronunciation may occur before  as well. The notable exceptions are gaol (now more commonly spelled jail) and margarine (a French borrowing whose original hard  softened for unknown reasons, even though the name Margaret has a hard ). The soft pronunciation of algae, the only one heard in North America, is sometimes cited as an exception, but it is actually conformant,  being an alternate spelling for a vowel in the  family. Though this pronunciation is listed first in some British dictionaries, hard pronunciation due to misinterpretation of the digraph  is widespread in British English and is listed second or alone in some British dictionaries. In some words, a soft  has lost its trailing  due to suffixing, but the combination  would imply the soft pronunciation anyway (e.g. fledgling, judgment, pledgor).

While , which also has hard and soft pronunciations, exists alongside  (which always indicates a hard pronunciation),  has no analogous letter or letter combination which consistently indicates a hard  sound, even though English uses  consistently for the soft  sound (the rationale for the spelling change of "gaol" to "jail"). This leads to special issues regarding the "neatness" of orthography when suffixes are added to words that end in a hard- sound. This additionally leads to many words spelled with g  and pronounced with a hard , including what may be the most common g  word "get". It has also resulted in the file format GIF having two possible pronunciations, with both hard  and soft  in common use.

Suffixation
When suffixes are added to words ending with a hard or soft  , the sound is normally maintained. Sometimes the normal rules of spelling changes before suffixes can help signal whether the hard or soft sound is intended. For example, as an accidental byproduct of the rule that doubles consonants in this situation after a short vowel, a double  will normally indicate the hard pronunciation (e.g. bagged is pronounced , not as ).

There are occasional exceptions where alternations between the hard and soft sound occur before different suffixes. Examples are analogous (hard) vs. analogy (soft); similarly, prodigal with prodigy. These are generally cases where the entire word, including the suffix, has been imported from Latin, and the general Romance-language pattern of soft  before front vowels, but hard  otherwise, is preserved.

Sometimes a silent letter is added to help indicate pronunciation. For example, a silent  usually indicates the soft pronunciation, as in change; this may be maintained before a suffix to indicate this pronunciation (as in changeable), despite the rule that usually drops this letter. A silent  can also indicate a soft pronunciation, particularly with the suffixes -gion and -gious (as in region, contagious). A silent  can indicate a hard pronunciation in words borrowed from French (as in analogue, league, guide) or words influenced by French spelling conventions (guess, guest); a silent  serves a similar purpose in Italian-derived words (ghetto, spaghetti).

A silent  can occur at the end of a word – or at the end of a component root word that is part of a larger word – after  as well as word-internally. In this situation, the  usually serves a marking function that helps to indicate that the  immediately before it is soft. Examples include image, management, and pigeon. Such a silent  also indicates that the vowel before  is a historic long vowel, as in rage, oblige, and range. When adding one of the above suffixes, this silent  is often dropped and the soft pronunciation remains. While  commonly indicates a soft pronunciation, the silent  may be dropped before another consonant while retaining the soft pronunciation in a number of words such judgment and abridgment. Also, the word veg, a clipped form of vegetate, retains the soft pronunciation despite being spelled without a silent  (i.e., pronounced as if spelled vedge).

Letter combinations
English has many words of Romance origin, especially from French and Italian. The ones from Italian often retain the conventions of Italian orthography whereby  represents hard  before e and i and gi and ge represent soft  (often even without any semivowel/vowel sound, thus representing /dʒ/ just as j usually does in English orthography). The ones from French and Spanish often retain the conventions of French orthography and Spanish orthography whereby  represents hard  before e and i and gi and ge represent soft  (often realized as /ʒ/ in French and as /h/ or /χ/ in Spanish). A consequence of these orthographic tendencies is that g before o or a is almost never soft  in English—one way in which English orthography, which is generally not especially phonemic or regular, displays strong regularity in at least one aspect. A few exceptions include turgor and digoxin, for which the most common pronunciations use soft  despite the lack of "softness signal" gi or ge. But both of those words also have hard  pronunciations that are accepted variants, which reflects the spelling pronunciation pressure generated by the strong regularity of the digraph conventions. 

The letters , when final, represent , as in orange; when not final their pronunciation varies according to the word's etymology (e.g.  in danger,  in anger,  in banger). In most cases,  represents  as in dagger, but it may also represent  as in suggest and exaggerate. (The same pair of facts can also be said of how  relates to hard and soft C, as, for example, in succinct and flaccid.)

The digraph  is sometimes used to indicate a hard  pronunciation before  (e.g. guess, guitar, Guinness), including cases where  is silent (e.g., rogue, intrigue, catalogue, analogue). In some cases, the intervening  is pronounced as /w/ (distinguish, unguent).

Other languages

Latin script
  in Italian and Romanian
  in French and Portuguese
  in Catalan

Different languages use different strategies to indicate a hard pronunciation before front vowels:
 Italian and Romanian writing systems use  (e.g. Italian laghi, Romanian ghid),
 French, Catalan, Spanish, and Portuguese orthographies use a silent  (e.g. French guerre, Catalan guerra, Spanish guitarra, Portuguese guitarra). Spanish vergüenza is pronounced , with both a hard  and non-mute ).
In Portuguese (especially Brazilian Portuguese) this was also used until the most recent orthographic reform (the new orthography now being compulsory in Brazil after a 2009-2016 transition period).

Italian giorno, French mangeons), though Spanish, Portuguese, French and Catalan use  as in jueves.

Several North Germanic languages also make a hard/soft distinction.
  in Swedish before 
  in Norwegian before 
  in Faroese before , but not before 

In German, the g is mostly a hard g, also before e and i: geben (to give), Geld (money), Gier (greed), Gift (poison, venom). Soft g occurs in loanwords, usually preserving the original pronunciation. However others, such as agieren (act, agitate), Generation (generation) or Gymnasium (academic high school), are pronounced with a hard g. Some pronunciations vary by region: The word Giraffe is pronounced with a soft G in Austria, but with a hard G in Germany. The g in Magnet is pronounced as a hard g, but the gn in Champagner is pronounced like the French gn in champagne. The letter combination ng is usually merged to a velar nasal, and the g is not spoken in its own right; e.g., in the German word Finger, it is not audible as in the English word finger. However, when those letters are pronounced separately, as in compound words like Eingabe (input) or also in verbs like fingieren (to feign), both the n and the hard g is clearly audible. There are exceptions in loanwords like French-derived rangieren (to rank, to shunt), spoken with a velar nasal and a soft g.

The orthography of Luganda is similar to Italian in having a soft  pronunciation before front vowels (namely ) and  indicates this soft pronunciation.

Because Esperanto orthography is phonemic,  always represents a hard g; a soft g is represented by the accented letter .

However, since it was inherited from European Romance languages (Portuguese and Italian) except the diacritics which were from Greek; the letter  never occurs in "soft positions", i.e. before ,  and  where the digraph  (colloquially known as gờ ghép "composed ") is used instead. Likewise, the trigraph  (ngờ ghép "composed ") also replaces the digraph  in those positions. "gh" can be explained as following Italian convention, and "ngh" as a form of analogy.

Other scripts

In Modern Greek, which uses the Greek alphabet, the Greek letter gamma – which is ancestral to the Roman letters  and  – has "soft-type" and "hard-type" pronunciations, though Greek speakers do not use such a terminology. In other instances, the "hard" pronunciation (that is, the voiced velar fricative ) occurs.

The soft pronunciation of  occurs before any of the "softening" vowels  and the hard pronunciation occurs elsewhere.

In Modern Hebrew, which uses the Hebrew alphabet, the letter gimel typically has the  sound within Hebrew words, although in some Sephardic dialects, it represents  or  when written with a dagesh (i.e., a dot placed inside the letter), and  when without a dagesh. An apostrophe-like symbol called a Geresh can be added immediately to the left of a gimel (i.e.) to indicate that the gimel represents an affricate ).

See also
English orthography
G
Hard and soft C
Hard and soft G in Dutch
Pronunciation of GIF

Notes

References

 
 

Consonants
Spelling
English orthography